Wheeler is an unincorporated community and census-designated place (CDP) in Grant County, Washington, United States. As of the 2020 census, it had a population of 74.

A spur of the BNSF Railway runs through Wheeler, serving various industries to the west of the community.

References 

Populated places in Grant County, Washington
Census-designated places in Grant County, Washington
Census-designated places in Washington (state)